Santa Rosa de los Pastos Grandes is a village and rural municipality in Salta Province in northwestern Argentina.

See also
Salta–Antofagasta railway

References

Populated places in Salta Province